Vasa Township is a township in Goodhue County, Minnesota, United States. The population was 872 at the 2000 census.

Vasa Township was organized in 1858, and named for Gustav I of Sweden (Gustav Vasa).

Geography
According to the United States Census Bureau, the township has a total area of 41.2 square miles (106.6 km), of which 41.0 square miles (106.1 km)  is land and 0.2 square mile (0.5 km)  (0.49%) is water.

State Highway 19 (MN 19) and County 7 Boulevard are two of the main routes in the township.

Demographics
As of the census of 2000, there were 872 people, 293 households, and 239 families residing in the township.  The population density was 21.3 people per square mile (8.2/km).  There were 310 housing units at an average density of 7.6/sq mi (2.9/km).  The racial makeup of the township was 99.08% White, 0.11% African American, 0.23% Native American, 0.11% from other races, and 0.46% from two or more races. Hispanic or Latino of any race were 0.80% of the population.

There were 293 households, out of which 42.0% had children under the age of 18 living with them, 68.9% were married couples living together, 5.8% had a female householder with no husband present, and 18.1% were non-families. 13.0% of all households were made up of individuals, and 6.1% had someone living alone who was 65 years of age or older.  The average household size was 2.98 and the average family size was 3.29.

In the township the population was spread out, with 30.3% under the age of 18, 6.5% from 18 to 24, 27.2% from 25 to 44, 25.1% from 45 to 64, and 10.9% who were 65 years of age or older.  The median age was 38 years. For every 100 females, there were 106.6 males.  For every 100 females age 18 and over, there were 106.1 males.

The median income for a household in the township was $53,281, and the median income for a family was $56,688. Males had a median income of $33,750 versus $22,500 for females. The per capita income for the township was $23,629.  About 3.0% of families and 4.9% of the population were below the poverty line, including 4.6% of those under age 18 and 8.1% of those age 65 or over.

See also
 Vasa, Finland

References

Townships in Goodhue County, Minnesota
Townships in Minnesota
Swedish-American history